Sobasina is a genus of jumping spiders that was first described by Eugène Louis Simon in 1898. These spiders look somewhat like ants, except for S. paradoxa, which looks more like a beetle.

Species
 it contains sixteen species, found only in Oceania, Malaysia, and Indonesia:
Sobasina alboclypea Wanless, 1978 – Solomon Is.
Sobasina amoenula Simon, 1898 (type) – Solomon Is.
Sobasina aspinosa Berry, Beatty & Prószyński, 1998 – Fiji
Sobasina coriacea Berry, Beatty & Prószyński, 1998 – Palau (Caroline Is.)
Sobasina cutleri Berry, Beatty & Prószyński, 1998 – Fiji
Sobasina hutuna Wanless, 1978 – Solomon Is. (Rennell Is.)
Sobasina magna Berry, Beatty & Prószyński, 1998 – Tonga
Sobasina paradoxa Berry, Beatty & Prószyński, 1998 – Fiji
Sobasina platnicki Prószyński & Deeleman-Reinhold, 2013 – Indonesia (Borneo)
Sobasina platypoda Berry, Beatty & Prószyński, 1998 – Fiji
Sobasina scutata Wanless, 1978 – Papua New Guinea (Bismarck Arch.)
Sobasina solomonensis Wanless, 1978 – Solomon Is.
Sobasina sylvatica Edmunds & Prószyński, 2001 – Malaysia
Sobasina tanna Wanless, 1978 – Vanuatu
Sobasina wanlessi Zhang & Maddison, 2012 – Papua New Guinea
Sobasina yapensis Berry, Beatty & Prószyński, 1998 – Micronesia (Caroline Is.)

References

Further reading

Salticidae
Salticidae genera
Spiders of Asia
Spiders of Oceania
Spiders of South America